Seneca Castle is a hamlet in Ontario County, New York, United States. Seneca Castle has a post office with ZIP code 14547.

Notable person
 Mary Gray Peck (1867–1957), journalist, suffragist, and clubwoman

References

Hamlets in Ontario County, New York
Hamlets in New York (state)